Urbano Barberini (1664 – 27 September 1722) was an Italian nobleman of the House of Barberini, third hereditary Prince of Palestrina and last legitimate male heir of the Barberini line from Pope Urban VIII.

Biography

Urbano Barberini was the fourth child of the marriage, of Maffeo Barberini and Olimpia Giustiniani, which had reconciled the Barberini with the papacy after the Wars of Castro and falling out with Pope Innocent X.

He was a brother of Cardinal Francesco Barberini (Junior) and a cousin of Rinaldo d'Este, Duke of Modena whose mother, Lucrezia Barberini, was Urbano's aunt.

At his father's death he inherited the Barberini comune of Palestrina and became the 3rd Barberini Prince of Palestrina. Like his father, he was made a Knight of the Order of the Golden Fleece (in 1687).

The legitimate male Barberini line became extinct at Urbano's death in 1722 and the Barberini name and title's were transferred to Giulio Cesare and the House of Colonna di Sciarra.

Marriages

Barberini was married three times.

Cornelia Zeno Ottoboni

In 1691 he married Cornelia Zeno Ottoboni (sister of Cardinal Pietro Ottoboni). Her last will and testament gives some idea of the wealth the Barberini had amassed under Urbano's grandfather, Taddeo Barberini and his brothers who had all benefited from their uncle Pope Urban VIII's famous nepotism.

Felice Ventimiglia Pignatelli d'Aragona

In 1693 he married Felice Ventimiglia Pignatelli d'Aragona. It was an unhappy marriage for both parties. Though they had a son, a much-awaited legitimate heir for the Barberini house, he died at the age of three. The two separated and she sought refuge with her brother-in-law, Urbano's Cardinal brother Francesco and later joined a convent within his bishopric. Her dowry, later her legacy upon her death, was left to Francesco. Neither she nor Urbano made mention of each other in their respective wills.

Maria Teresa Boncompagni

In 1714, now 50 years old and still without a legitimate male heir, Barberini married 22-year-old  Maria Teresa Boncompagni (daughter of   Gregorio II Boncompagni, Duke of Sora, and Ippolita Ludovisi). They had one daughter, Cornelia Constance Barberini. When she was 12 years old, Urbano's brother Francesco encouraged her to marry Giulio Cesare Colonna di Sciarra. Maria Teresa wrote hundreds of pages to the Pope urging him to disallow the marriage knowing that as a Cardinal, Francesco could perform the marriage ceremony himself.

Eventually they were married but Cornelia Constance Barberini remained Urbano Barberini's only legitimate heir.

Maffeo Callisto Barberini

Though none of his wives bore him a legitimate male heir, there are many mentions of an illegitimate male heir to the House of Barberini, Maffeo Callisto Barberini. Born in 1688, his birth predates any of Barberini's marriages.

The will of Urbano Barberini's last wife, Maria Teresa Boncompagni, makes mention of this Maffeo Callisto as the Marquis of Corese  and she expresses "appreciation and gratitude" for him. A large portion of the Barberini estate was left for him in her will.

Later her progeny came into conflict with him over claims to the Barberini estate but the quarrel was settled with an agreement signed in Paris in 1811 which divided the estate between the two claimant branches of the family.

References

1664 births
1722 deaths
U
17th-century Italian nobility